Étienne, a French analog of Stephen or Steven, is a masculine given name. An archaic variant of the name, prevalent up to the mid-17th century, is Estienne.

Étienne, Etienne, Ettiene or Ettienne may refer to:

People

Scientists and inventors
Étienne Bézout (1730–1783), French mathematician
Étienne Louis Geoffroy (1725–1810), French entomologist and pharmacist
Étienne Laspeyres (1834–1913), German professor of economics and statistics
Étienne Lenoir (1822–1900), Belgian engineer who invented the first internal combustion engine to be produced in numbers
Étienne Lenoir (instrument maker) (1744–1832), French scientific instrument maker and inventor of the repeating circle surveying instrument
Étienne Mulsant (1797–1880), French entomologist and ornithologist
Étienne Pascal (1588–1651), French lawyer, scientist and mathematician best known as the father of Blaise Pascal
Étienne Geoffroy Saint-Hilaire (1772–1844), French naturalist
Étienne Pierre Ventenat (1757–1808), French botanist
Étienne Wasserzug (1860-1888), French biologist

Intellectuals and academics
Étienne Balazs (1905–1963), Hungarian-born French sinologist
Étienne Balibar (born 1942), French Marxist philosopher and professor
Étienne Baluze (1630–1718), French scholar also known as Stephanus Baluzius
Étienne de La Boétie (1530–1563), French intellectual and noted friend of Michel de Montaigne
Étienne Cabet (1788–1856), French philosopher and utopian socialist
Étienne Bonnot de Condillac (1715–1780), French philosopher
Étienne Dolet (1509–1546), French scholar, translator and printer
Étienne Fourmont (1683–1745), French orientalist
Étienne Gilson (1884–1978), French philosopher
Étienne Hubert (Arabist) (1567–1614), French physician, Orientalist and diplomat, also known as Stephanus Hubertus
Étienne Lamotte (1903–1983), Belgian priest, Indologist and authority on Buddhism 
Etienne Vermeersch (born 1934), Belgian philosopher
Étienne Weill-Raynal (1887–1982), French historian, resistant, journalist and Socialist politician. 
Étienne Wenger (born 1952), education theorist

Politicians, government officials and soldiers
Étienne François, duc de Choiseul (1719-1785), French military officer,  statesman and diplomat
Étienne Bazeries (1846–1931), French military cryptanalyst
Étienne Eustache Bruix (1759-1805), French Navy admiral
Étienne Clavière (1735–1793), Swiss-born French financier and politician of the French Revolution
Étienne Clémentel (1864-1936), French politician
Étienne Compayré (1748-1817), French politician.
Étienne Davignon (born 1932), Belgian politician, businessman and former vice-president of the European Commission
Étienne Maurice Gérard, comte Gérard (1773–1852), French general and statesman
Étienne Guy (1774–1820), surveyor and politician in Lower Canada
Etienne van der Horst (born 1958), Curaçaoan politician
Etyen Mahçupyan (born 1950), Turkish-Armenian journalist, writer and politician
Étienne Manac'h (1910-1992), French diplomat and writer
Étienne Marcel (died 1358), provost of the merchants of Paris under King John II
Étienne Parent (1802–1874), Canadian journalist and government official
Étienne Perier (governor) (1687-1766), French naval officer and colonial administrator
Étienne Richaud (1841-1889), Governor of French India
Etienne Saqr (born 1937), Lebanese founder of the Guardians of the Cedars militia and political party
Étienne Tshisekedi (born 1932), politician in the Democratic Republic of the Congo
Étienne de Vignolles (1390-1443), called La Hire, a French military commander during the Hundred Years' War and a close comrade of Joan of Arc
Etienne Ys (born 1962), twice Prime Minister of the Netherlands Antilles
Martine Etienne (born 1956), French politician

Arts and entertainment
Etienne Aigner (1904–2000), Hungarian-born German fashion designer
Étienne Chatiliez (born 1952), French film director
Étienne de Crécy (born 1969), French electronic music producer and DJ
Étienne Daho (born 1956), French singer, songwriter and record producer
Etienne Debel (1931–1993), Belgian actor and director
Étienne Doirat (c. 1675–1732), French furniture designer.
Étienne Maurice Falconet (1716–1791), French Rococo sculptor
Etienne Girardot (1856–1939), Anglo-French actor
Étienne Jodelle, seigneur de Limodin (1532–1573), French dramatist and poet
Étienne Loulié (1654–1702), French musician, pedagogue and musical theorist
Étienne Méhul (1763–1817), French composer
Étienne Moulinié (1599–1676), French Baroque composer
Étienne Périer (director) (1931–2020), Belgian film director

Sports
Étienne Bally (born 1923), French sprinter
Etienne Barbara (born 1982), Maltese footballer
Étienne Boulay (born 1983), Canadian football player
Étienne Capoue (born 1988), French footballer
Étienne Dagon (born 1960), Swiss breaststroke swimmer
Ettiene de Bruyn (born 1977), South African cricketer
Étienne Desmarteau (1873-1905), Canadian winner of the 54 pound weight throw at the 1904 Olympics
Étienne Didot (born 1983), French footballer
Etienne Eto'o (born 1990), Cameroonian footballer
Étienne Mattler (1905–1986), French footballer
Etienne L. de Mestre (1832–1916), Australian racehorse trainer
Etienne Oosthuizen (rugby union, born 1992), South African rugby union player
Etienne Oosthuizen (rugby union, born 1994), South African rugby union player
Ettienne Richardson (born 1981), Grenadian footballer
Ettiene Smit (born 1974), South African strongman competitor
Etienne Stott (born 1979), English slalom canoeist

Other
Étienne Bacrot (born 1983), French chess player, formerly the youngest person ever to have earned the Grandmaster title
Étienne Brûlé (c. 1592–c. 1643), French explorer in what is now Canada
Étienne Gaboury (born 1930), Canadian architect
Étienne Pasquier (1529–1615), French lawyer and man of letters
Étienne Pernet (1824–1899), French Roman Catholic priest, founder of Little Sisters of the Assumption Order
Étienne Provost (1785–1850), French-Canadian fur trader
Étienne Tempier (died 1279), also known as Stephanus of Orleans, French bishop of Paris and Chancellor of the Sorbonne

Fictional characters
Étienne of Navarre, a main character in Ladyhawke, a 1985 historical-fantasy, played by Rutger Hauer
Etienne Argeneau, one of the main characters of Lynsay Sands' romance novel Love Bites
Ettienne R. LaFitte, "real" name of Gung-Ho (G.I. Joe)
Étienne Lantier, protagonist of Émile Zola's novel Germinal
Étienne St. Clair, a main character in the novel Anna and the French Kiss by Stephanie Perkins
Etienne LeBlanc, a main character in the novel All the Light We Cannot See by Anthony Doerr
Etienne, A hero in the tower defense game Bloons TD 6

See also 
Saint Etienne (disambiguation)
Jean-Étienne
Stéphane

References

French masculine given names
French-language surnames